Brad Cassidy (born 25 July 1976) is an Australian rules footballer.

Fremantle career 
Brad was drafted in 1994 as a pre draft selection and was delisted at the end of the 1995 season after playing no games.

Fitzroy career 
Brad was drafted in the 1995 national draft at selection 49 and was delisted at the end of the 1996 season when Fitzroy merged with the Brisbane Bears, after playing 14 games.

Collingwood career 
Brad was drafted in 1996 national draft at selection 65 and was delisted at the end of the season after only playing the final 2 games of the year.

After football 
Brad moved to Warrnambool to coach before moving to Stawell and starting a painting business (Cassidy Painting).
He is married to Leisa and they have 3 children, Josh, Ella & Chloe. He now coaches (2010, 2014 - 2015) Stawell football club in the Wimmera league.

External links

1976 births
Living people
Fitzroy Football Club players
Collingwood Football Club players
Australian rules footballers from Victoria (Australia)
Greater Western Victoria Rebels players